Free Drugs ;-) is the first studio album by Austin, Texas based garage rock band Harlem. It was self-released in the summer of 2008.

Track listing
 "Witchgreens"
 "Caroline"
 "South of France"
 "Irresistible"
 "Beautiful & Very Smart"
 "Psychedelic Tits"
 "Think I'm Thinkin Bout"
 "Disneyland"
 "Little Black Cowboy"
 "I'm on Drugs"
 "Red Herring"
 "Hundred a Dollar a Night Man"
 "Eggs and Stank Gas"

References

2008 albums